Martynas Linkevičius (born 8 December 1985) is a Lithuanian professional basketball player. He mostly plays in Small forward position.

Professional career
Martynas Linkevičius started his professional career in Bremena Tauragė. Linkevičius was named MVP of the week in March 2015 after scoring 31 points in a game. He was again named MVP of the week of November 13, 2017 after scoring 22 points against BC Pieno žvaigždės. He had 16 points in the Big Baller Brand Challenge in January 2018.

Disqualification
On 17 June 2008, playing in Kaunas amateur league, Linkevičius beat referee by kicking with knee to referee back, and one more time when referee was on the ground. On 25 June, Linkevičius has been disqualified for two years to play in any official LKF match.

References

External links
  at basketnews.lt

1985 births
Living people
Small forwards
Basketball players from Kaunas